This is a list of television broadcasters from around the world which provide coverage of the FIFA Club World Cup.

Broadcasters

2022

References

FIFA Club World Cup
FIFA Club World Cup